Lee I. Levine  is an American-born Israeli rabbi, archaeologist and historian of classical Judaism.  He is a strong believer in the ability of the Jewish people and Judaism to adapt to local settings as a key to survival.  He is the author of Judaism and Hellenism in Antiquity and The Ancient Synagogue, one of the most comprehensive texts on the subject.

Levine is a professor of Jewish history and archaeology at the Hebrew University of Jerusalem. He received degrees at the Jewish Theological Seminary of America (JTS), where he was ordained as a Conservative rabbi, and Columbia University.  He was a student of Gerson Cohen. In 1961, Levine married Mira Karp, whom he met at Camp Ramah. Levine has also taught at Yale University and the Seminary of Judaic Studies in Jerusalem. He has directed several archaeological digs, among them a dig in Caesarea and the excavation of the Hurvat Amudim Synagogue.

Published work
 The Ancient Synagogue: The First Thousand Years, Second Edition, Yale University Press, 2005
 Jerusalem: Portrait of the City in the Second Temple Period (538 B.C.E.-70 C.E.), Jewish Publication Society of America, 2003
 Judaism and Hellenism in Antiquity: Conflict or Confluence?, Hendrickson Publishers, 1999
 Rabbinic Class of Roman Palestine in Late Antiquity, Jewish Theological Seminary of America, 1990

References

Year of birth missing (living people)
Living people
Israeli archaeologists
Columbia University alumni
Historians of Jews and Judaism
Israeli historians of religion
Jewish Theological Seminary of America alumni